Joshua Dalai Mancha García (born 5 October 2004) is a Mexican footballer who plays as an attacking midfielder for Liga MX club Santos Laguna.

International career
Mancha was called up to the under-20 team by Luis Ernesto Pérez to participate at the 2021 Revelations Cup, where Mexico won the competition. He was called up again to the Mexico U20 team this time by Adrián Sánchez to participate at the 2022 Revelations Cup, scoring one goal in three appearances, where Mexico won the competition.

Career statistics

Club

Honours
Mexico U20
Revelations Cup: 2021, 2022

Individual
Revelations Cup Best Player: 2022

References

External links
 
 
 

Living people
2004 births
Mexican footballers
Mexico under-20 international footballers
Mexico youth international footballers
Association football forwards
Santos Laguna footballers
Liga MX players
Footballers from Durango
People from Gómez Palacio, Durango